Pinchgut Opera is a chamber opera company in Sydney, Australia, presenting opera from the 17th and 18th centuries performed on period instruments. Founded in 2002, Pinchgut stages two operas each year in Sydney's City Recital Hall. It also performs concerts in both Sydney and Melbourne.

The company utilises the professional chamber choir Cantillation as its chorus and has engaged both the Sirius Ensemble and the Orchestra of the Antipodes. Pinchgut draws most of its singers, players, directors and designers from Australia. Its artistic director is Erin Helyard. Antony Walker co-founded the company and conducted the early Pinchgut productions. All productions are recorded by Greenside Productions and Mano Musica and are released on CD under the "Pinchgut Live" label.

Pinchgut Opera draws its unusual name from Fort Denison, a former penal site in Sydney Harbour which was nicknamed "Pinchgut" by its inmates. According to its website, the company chose the name "as we wanted something recognisably Sydney, easy to remember and as a reminder of our tight budgets and humble beginnings".

Productions
2002: Semele by George Frideric Handel (1743)
2003:The Fairy-Queen by Henry Purcell (1692)
2004: L'Orfeo by Claudio Monteverdi (1607)
2005: Dardanus by Jean-Philippe Rameau (1739) – Australian première
2006: Idomeneo by Wolfgang Amadeus Mozart (1781)
2007: Juditha triumphans, RV 644, by Antonio Vivaldi (1716)
A staged production of Vivaldi's oratorio was directed by Mark Gaal and designed by Hamish Peters. Mezzo-soprano Sally-Anne Russell sang the title role, alongside Sara Macliver (Abra), David Walker (Holofernes), Fiona Campbell (Vagaus) and Renae Martin (Ozias). The Orchestra of the Antipodes was conducted from the harpsichord by Attilio Cremonesi; Cantillation was the chorus.
2008: David et Jonathas H.490 by Marc-Antoine Charpentier (1688)
Soloists included Swedish tenor Anders J. Dahlin, soprano Sara Macliver, basses Dean Robinson, Richard Anderson and David Parkin, baritone Simon Lobelson and tenor Paul McMahon. Antony Walker conducted the Orchestra of the Antipodes (playing authentic instruments of the period) with Cantillation as the chorus. This was a fully staged and costumed production directed by American director Chas Rader-Shieber and designed by Australian designers Brad Clark and Alex Sommer. Performances took place in early December at City Recital Hall Angel Place.
2009: L'Ormindo by Francesco Cavalli (1649)
The cast included American countertenor David Walker, who appeared as Holofernes in the company's 2007 Juditha triumphans. In the title role was Australian mezzo-soprano Fiona Campbell as Erisbe, while Opera Australia Principal Artists Taryn Fiebig and Kanen Breen, both made their Pinchgut débuts, as Sicle and Erice respectively. Erin Helyard conducted, and the director was Talya Masel. L'Ormindo opened at Sydney's City Recital Hall on 2 December 2009.
2010: L'anima del filosofo by Joseph Haydn (1791)
2011: Griselda by Antonio Vivaldi (1735)
2012: On 30 September, Pinchgut Opera performed works by Blavet, Rameau, Leclair, Lully, Mondonville and Handel in the Old Courts of the Art Gallery of New South Wales. The musicians in this concert were Celeste Lazarenko (soprano), Melissa Farrow (transverse flute), Anna McMichael (violin), Anthea Cottee (viola da gamba), and Erin Helyard (harpsichordist and director). The staged production of Castor et Pollux (1754) by Jean-Philippe Rameau followed later that year.
2013: Giasone by Francesco Cavalli (1644)
2014: Der Rauchfangkehrer (1781) by Antonio Salieri was presented in English as The Chimney Sweep. This was the first performance of this work in Australia and Pinchgut's first mid-year production, and Christoph Willibald Gluck's Iphigénie en Tauride (1779) following in December 2014, the 300th anniversary of Gluck's birth, with Caitlin Hulcup in the title role.
2015: Bajazet (1735) by Antonio Vivaldi in July 2015. This was the first performance of the work in Australia. The second opera was L'amant jaloux (1778) by André Grétry in December.
2016: Armida (1784) by Joseph Haydn in July 2016, followed by Theodora by G.F. Handel in December 2016.
2017: Triple bill of Anacreon (1754) by Rameau, Pigmalion (1748) by Rameau and Erighetta e Don Chilone by Vinci in June 2017, followed by L'Incoronazione di Poppea (Monteverdi) in November–December 2017.
2018: Athalia (1733) by Handel and Artasere (1730) by Hasse, and a concert in Melbourne featuring Vivica Genaux.
2019: The Return of Ulysses by Claudio Monteverdi (1639–40) and Farnace by Antonio Vivaldi (1727), and a concert in Sydney featuring Valer Sabadus.
2020: Médée H.491 by Marc-Antoine Charpentier and Rinaldo by George Frideric Handel; and two concerts, the first Splendour of Venice and the second Purcell and Charpentier.
2021: Platée (1745) by Rameau, conducted by Erin Helyard and directed by Neil Armfield, with Kanen Breen in the title role, Cheryl Barker as Juno and her husband, Peter Coleman-Wright, as Jupiter – Australian première
2022: Orontea (1656) by Antonio Cesti, Australian premiere
2023: Membra Jesu Nostri (1680) by Dieterich Buxtehude; Giustino (1683) by Giovanni Legrenzi, Australian premiere

Honours
 2019 International Opera Award for Best Rediscovered Work, for Hasse's Artaserse

National Live Music Awards
The National Live Music Awards (NLMAs) are a broad recognition of Australia's diverse live industry, celebrating the success of the Australian live scene. The awards commenced in 2016.

|-
| National Live Music Awards of 2019
| Pinchgut Opera
| Live Classical Act of the Year
| 
|-

References

Further reading
Cunningham, Harriet, "A Pair of Early-Music Entrepreneurs Launch a Chamber Opera Company in Sydney", andante.com, 4 December 2006. Retrieved 6 December 2009.

External links
 
Cantillation
Orchestra of the Antipodes, bach-cantatas.com
Antony Walker, official website

Musical groups established in 2002
Australian opera companies
2002 establishments in Australia
Historically informed performance
Culture of Sydney